Teruo (written: 輝雄, 輝男, 輝夫, 辉夫, 昭雄, 照雄 or 照夫) is a masculine Japanese given name. Notable people with the name include:

, Japanese footballer
, Imperial Japanese Navy admiral
, Japanese karateka
, Japanese sumo wrestler
, Japanese long-distance runner
, Japanese painter
, Japanese academic
, Japanese film director
, Japanese shot putter
, Japanese footballer
Teruo Kakuta, Japanese manga artist
Teruo Murakami, Japanese table tennis player
, Taiwanese-born Imperial Japanese Army soldier
Teruo Nakamura (golfer) (born 1952), Japanese golfer
, Japanese jazz musician
, Japanese footballer
, Japanese golfer
, Japanese writer
Terry Teruo Kawamura, United States Army soldier

See also
5924 Teruo, a main-belt asteroid

Japanese masculine given names